William Grüner (6 May 1888 – 15 February 1961) was a Swedish long-distance runner. He competed in the marathon at the 1912 and 1920 Summer Olympics.

References

External links
 

1888 births
1961 deaths
Athletes (track and field) at the 1912 Summer Olympics
Athletes (track and field) at the 1920 Summer Olympics
Swedish male long-distance runners
Swedish male marathon runners
Olympic athletes of Sweden
Athletes from Stockholm
20th-century Swedish people